NGC 243 is a lenticular galaxy located in the constellation Andromeda. It was discovered on October 18, 1881 by Édouard Stephan.

References

External links
 

0243
Lenticular galaxies
Andromeda (constellation)
002687
Discoveries by Édouard Stephan